Nothobroscina Roig-Juñent 2000 is one five subtribes within the ground beetle tribe Broscini. The subtribe consists of ten genera from the Gondwanan countries: Australia, New Caledonia, New Zealand and southern South America. All of the genera are endemic to their type country, i.e., none of the genera are shared across any of the Gondwanan countries.

Genera  
 Chylnus
 Diglymma
 Eurylychnus
 Mecodema
 Monteremita
 Nothobroscus
 Oregus
 Orthoglymma
 Percolestus
 Percosoma

References 
Liebherr, J. K., Marris, J. W., Emberson, R. M., Syrett, P., & Roig‐Juñent, S. (2011). Orthoglymma wangapeka gen. n., sp. n.(Coleoptera: Carabidae: Broscini): a newly discovered relict from the Buller Terrane, north‐western South Island, New Zealand, corroborates a general pattern of Gondwanan endemism. Systematic Entomology, 36(3), 395–414.

Seldon, David S., and Gregory I. Holwell. (2019) "Monteremita gen. nov. (Coleoptera: Carabidae), a new genus of ground beetle from New Caledonia." Austral Entomology 58, 4: 724–728.

Slipinski, A., & Lawrence, J. (Eds.). (2019). Australian Beetles Volume 2: Archostemata, Myxophaga, Adephaga, Polyphaga (part). CSIRO PUBLISHING.
Juñent, S. R., & Ball, G. E. (1995). Nothobroscus chilensis, new genus and new species, from southern South America (Coleoptera: Carabidae: Broscini). The Coleopterists' Bulletin, 301–312.

 
Broscini
Insect subtribes